Ana Whiterose (born February 5, 2001) is a Swiss singer and songwriter.

Early life 
Anastacia Gaillard was born on February 5, 2001, in Montreux, Switzerland. Her father is Swiss-Italian, while her mother is Russian.

Whiterose's first musical success occurred during Kids Voice Tour competition in 2016 where she made it to the finals.

Career 
In 2019 Whiterose signed with a Swiss independent record label The Hana Road Music Group. The same year she released her debut single "Behind the Moon". It entered Swiss radio chart #62 and became the 'Song of the Day' on one of the biggest Swiss radio stations SRF3.

The following single "Wanted to Tell You"  grabbed the attention of press media such as Cosmopolitan and OK!.

2021 Ana Whiterose's music video for her single "Breaking" won silver screenings at Berlin Music Video Awards 2021. The following artists were included in the same category: Alan Walker, David Guetta, Disclosure and many more.

Discography

References 

2001 births
Living people